Iezeru may refer to several places in Romania:
Iezeru, a village in Jegălia Commune, Călărași County
 Iezeru, a tributary of the Sadova in Suceava County
 Iezerul Mare, a tributary of the Bătrâna in Argeș County